Pachydactylus scutatus, also known as the large-scaled gecko or shielded thick-toed gecko, is a species of lizard in the family Gekkonidae. It is found in Namibia, South Africa, and Angola.

References

Pachydactylus
Reptiles of Namibia
Reptiles of South Africa
Reptiles of Angola
Reptiles described in 1927